A privy mark was originally a small mark or differentiation in the design of a coin for the purpose of identifying the mint, moneyer, some other aspect of the coin's origin, or to prevent counterfeiting. One of the first instances of a privy mark used as a counterfeit measure was during the 17th century in a plan proposed by Sir Edward Ford to mint farthings, halfpence and three-farthings.

In modern times, the privy mark is used as a design and marketing feature to commemorate a special event or signify that the coin is part of a set. It is still sometimes used to signify the location or origin of where the coin was minted, but is then usually referred to as a mint mark. Some privy marked coins – such as the Canadian Silver Privy Marked Maple Leaf – may sell at a premium.

See also
Mint mark

References

Numismatic terminology
Currency production